Davide Massa (born 15 July 1981) is an Italian football referee who officiates in Serie A. He has been a FIFA referee since 2014, and is ranked as a UEFA elite category referee.

Refereeing career
In 2011 he began officiating in Serie A. His first match as referee was on 23 January 2011 between Fiorentina and Lecce. In 2014, he was put on the FIFA referees list. He officiated his first senior international match on 8 June 2015 between Turkey and Bulgaria. In 2017, he was selected to officiate the 2017 Supercoppa Italiana between Juventus and Lazio.

Massa was selected as a referee for the 2017 UEFA European Under-19 Championship in Georgia and the 2019 FIFA U-20 World Cup in Poland. He has also officiated matches in the 2016–17 Qatar Stars League and 2017–18 Egyptian Premier League.

References

External links
 Profile at WorldFootball.net
 Profile at EU-Football.info

1981 births
Living people
People from Imperia
Italian football referees
Sportspeople from the Province of Imperia